Church of the Holy Mother of God was a Serbian Orthodox Church located in the village of Podgorce, in the municipality of Vitina, in Kosovo and Metohija. It belonged to the Diocese of Raška and Prizren of the Serbian Orthodox Church. The church was rebuilt and consecrated in 1996.

The destruction of the church in 1999 
The church was looted and burned by Kosovo Albanians after the arrival of the US KFOR troops.

References

External links 
 The list of destroyed and desecrated churches in Kosovo and Metohija June-October 1999 (Списак уништених и оскрнављених цркава на Косову и Метохији јун-октобар 1999)

Serbian Orthodox church buildings in Kosovo
Destroyed churches in Kosovo
Former Serbian Orthodox churches
20th-century Serbian Orthodox church buildings
Persecution of Serbs
Christian organizations established in 1996
Viti, Kosovo
Cultural heritage of Kosovo